Clint Dempsey is an American retired professional soccer player who represented the United States in international competition. From 2004 to 2017, Dempsey appeared 141 times for the national team and scored 57 goals. He is the joint all-time male top scorer for the United States, having tied Landon Donovan and his 57 goals. He was also ranked third worldwide among active international male goalscorers in 2017, behind Cristiano Ronaldo (79) of Portugal and Lionel Messi (61) of Argentina.

Dempsey made his national team debut on November 17, 2004, during a World Cup qualifier against Jamaica in Columbus, Ohio; the call-up came after his rookie season in Major League Soccer with the New England Revolution, where he recorded seven goals and one assist on the way to being named MLS Rookie of the Year. Dempsey scored his first national team goal on May 28, 2005, during a friendly match against England in Chicago. His first competitive national team goal came a month later against Cuba in Seattle during the 2005 CONCACAF Gold Cup, a tournament the United States would go on to win.

Dempsey was named to the 2006 FIFA World Cup roster for the United States and scored the only American goal of the whole tournament, during a 2–1 loss to Ghana in the final group stage match. He scored three goals at the 2009 FIFA Confederations Cup, one each against Egypt, Spain, and Brazil, and helped lead the United States to a finish as runners-up. Dempsey's sole goal during the 2010 FIFA World Cup came in a 1–1 draw to England, making him the second American to score in multiple World Cups. During the opening match of the 2014 FIFA World Cup against Ghana, Dempsey scored 30 seconds after kickoff, the fifth-fastest goal in World Cup history; he also became the first American to score in three consecutive World Cups. He was the top goalscorer at the 2015 CONCACAF Gold Cup, scoring seven goals for the United States during their tournament victory and setting a record for most goals scored by an American at the Gold Cup. On July 22, 2017, during a 2017 CONCACAF Gold Cup semifinal against Costa Rica, Dempsey tied Landon Donovan's record for all-time top scorer with his 57th goal. Donovan himself called Dempsey's record "much more impressive", adding that Dempsey had scored fewer penalties and achieved the record in fewer caps.

During his national team career, Dempsey scored two hat-tricks: against Cuba in the 2015 CONCACAF Gold Cup and Honduras in a 2018 FIFA World Cup qualifier. The plurality of his goals have come during FIFA World Cup qualification (18 goals), followed by friendly matches (16 goals) and the CONCACAF Gold Cup (13 goals). He has four World Cup goals in ten appearances, as well as three goals in the Confederations Cup and three goals in the Copa América.

International goals
"Score" represents the score in the match after Dempsey's goal. "Score" and "Result" list the United States' goal tally first. Last updated October 10, 2017.

Statistics
Sources: RSSSF, Soccer America, ESPN

By year

By competition

See also
List of men's footballers with 50 or more international goals
List of top international men's association football goal scorers by country

References

Soccer in the United States lists
Dempsey
United States men's national soccer team records and statistics